SM Chengdu is a shopping mall in Chenghua District, Chengdu, Sichuan province, China as part of expansion of SM Prime Holdings Philippines. It is owned and operated by SM Prime Holdings, under the management of Henry Sy, a Filipino-Chinese business tycoon.

See also
SM Prime Holdings
Other SM Malls in China
SM City Jinjiang
SM City Xiamen
SM Lifestyle Center

References

Shopping malls in Chengdu
Chengdu